The history of Jordan refers to the history of the Hashemite Kingdom of Jordan and the background period of the Emirate of Transjordan under British protectorate as well as the general history of the region of Transjordan.

There is evidence of human activity in Transjordan as early as the Paleolithic period. The area was settled by nomadic tribes in the Bronze Age, which consolidated in small kingdoms during the Iron Age – such as the Ammonites, Moabites and Edomites, with partial areas controlled by the Israelites. In the classic period, Transjordan came under Greek and later Roman influence. Under the Romans and the Byzantines, Transjordan was home to the Decapolis in the north, with much of the region being designated as Byzantine Arabia. Classical kingdoms located in the region of Transjordan, such as the Roman-era Nabatean kingdom, which had its capital at Petra, left particularly dramatic ruins popular today with tourists and filmmakers. The history of Transjordan continued with the Muslim empires starting in the 7th century, partial crusader control in the mid-Middle Ages (country of Oultrejordain) and finally, Mamluk rule from the 13th century and Ottoman rule between the 16th century and the First World War.

With the Great Arab Revolt in 1916 and the consequent British invasion, the area came under the Anglo-Arab ruled Occupied Enemy Territory Administration East in 1917, which was declared as the Arab Kingdom of Syria in 1920. Following the French occupation of only the northern part of the Syrian Kingdom, Transjordan was left in a period of interregnum. A few months later, Abdullah, the second son of Sharif Hussein, arrived in Transjordan. With the Transjordan memorandum to the Mandate for Palestine in the early 1920s, it became the Emirate of Transjordan under the Hashemite Emir. In 1946, independent Hashemite Kingdom of Transjordan was formed and shortly admitted to the United Nations and the Arab League. In 1948, Jordan fought with the newly born state of Israel over lands of former Mandatory Palestine, effectively gaining control of the West Bank and annexing it with its Palestinian population. Jordan lost the West Bank in the 1967 War with Israel, and since became the central base of the Palestine Liberation Organization (PLO) in its struggle against Israel. The alliance between the PLO and the Jordanians, active during the War of Attrition, came to an end in the bloody Black September in Jordan in 1970, when a civil war between Jordanians and Palestinians (with Syrian Ba'athist support) took thousands of lives. In the aftermath, the defeated PLO was forced out of Jordan together with tens of thousands of its fighters and their Palestinian families, relocating to South Lebanon.

Stone Age

Evidence of human activity in Jordan dates back to the Paleolithic period. While there is no architectural evidence from this era, archaeologists have found tools, such as flint and basalt hand-axes, knives and scraping implements.

In the Neolithic period (8500–4500 BC) three major shifts occurred. First, people became sedentary, living in small villages, and discovering and domesticating new food sources such as cereal grains, peas and lentils, as well as goats. The human population increased to tens of thousands.

Second, this shift in settlement pattern appears to have been catalyzed by a marked change in climate. The eastern desert, in particular, grew warmer and drier, eventually to the point where it became uninhabitable for most of the year. This watershed climate change is believed to have occurred between 6500 and 5500 BC.

Third, beginning sometime between 5500 and 4500 BC, the inhabitants began to make pottery from clay rather than plaster. Pottery-making technologies were probably introduced to the area by craftsmen from Mesopotamia.

The largest Neolithic site in Jordan is at Ein Ghazal in Amman. The many buildings were divided into three distinct districts. Houses were rectangular and had several rooms, some with plastered floors. Archaeologists have unearthed skulls covered with plaster and with bitumen in the eye sockets at sites throughout Jordan, Israel, the Palestinian Territories and Syria. A statue discovered at Ein Ghazal is thought to be 8,000 years old. Just over one meter high, it depicts a woman with huge eyes, skinny arms, knobby knees and a detailed rendering of her toes.

Chalcolithic

During the Chalcolithic period (4500–3200 BC), copper began to be smelted and used to make axes, arrowheads and hooks. The cultivation of barley, dates, olives and lentils, and the domestication of sheep and goats, rather than hunting, predominated. The lifestyle in the desert was probably very similar to that of modern Bedouins.

Tuleitat Ghassul is a large Chalcolithic era village located in the Jordan Valley. The walls of its houses were made of sun-dried mud bricks; its roofs of wood, reeds and mud. Some had stone foundations, and many had large central courtyards. The walls are often painted with bright images of masked men, stars, and geometric motifs, which may have been connected to religious beliefs.

Bronze Age

Many of the villages built during the Early Bronze Age (3200–1950 BC) included simple water infrastructures, as well as defensive fortifications probably designed to protect against raids by neighboring nomadic tribes.

At Bab al-Dhra in Wadi `Araba, archaeologists discovered more than 20,000 shaft tombs with multiple chambers as well as houses of mud-brick containing human bones, pots, jewelry and weapons. Hundreds of dolmens scattered throughout the mountains have been dated to the late Chalcolithic and Early Bronze Ages.

Although writing was developed before 3000 BC in Egypt and Mesopotamia, it was generally not used in Jordan, Canaan and Syria until some thousand years later, even though archaeological evidence indicates that the inhabitants of Transjordan were trading with Egypt and Mesopotamia.

Between 2300 and 1950 BC, many of the large, fortified hilltop towns were abandoned in favor of either small, unfortified villages or a pastoral lifestyle. There is no consensus on what caused this shift, though it is thought to have been a combination of climatic and political changes that brought an end to the city-state network.

During the Middle Bronze Age (1950–1550 BC), migration across the Middle East increased. Trading continued to develop between Egypt, Syria, Arabia, and Canaan including Transjordan, resulting in the spread of technology and other hallmarks of civilization. Bronze, forged from copper and tin, enabled the production of more durable axes, knives, and other tools and weapons. Large, distinct communities seem to have arisen in northern and central Jordan, while the south was populated by a nomadic, Bedouin-type of people known as the Shasu.

New fortifications appeared at sites like Amman's Citadel, Irbid, and Tabaqat Fahl (or Pella). Towns were surrounded by ramparts made of earth embankments, and the slopes were covered in hard plaster, making the climb slippery and difficult. Pella was enclosed by massive walls and watch towers.

Archaeologists usually date the end of the Middle Bronze Age to about 1550 BC, when the Hyksos were driven out of Egypt during the 17th and 18th Dynasties. A number of Middle Bronze Age towns in Canaan including Transjordan were destroyed during this time.

Iron Age

During the Iron Age (1200–332 BC), Transjordan was home to the Kingdoms of Ammon, Edom and Moab. The peoples of these kingdoms spoke Semitic languages of the Canaanite group; their polities are considered to be tribal kingdoms rather than states. Ammon was located in the Amman plateau, and its capital was Rabbath Ammon; Moab was located in the highlands east of the Dead Sea with the capital at Kir of Moab (Kerak); and Edom in the area around Wadi Araba in the south, with the capital at Bozrah. The northwestern region of the Transjordan, known then as Gilead, was inhabited by the Israelites. According to the Bible, the Transjordan was home to the Israelite tribes of Reuben, Gad, and the half-tribe of Manasseh.

The Transjordanian kingdoms of Ammon, Edom and Moab continually clashed with the neighboring Hebrew kingdoms of Israel and Judah, centered west of the Jordan River. One record of this is the Mesha Stele, erected by the Moabite king Mesha in 840 BC; on it he lauds himself for the building projects that he initiated in Moab and commemorates his glory and victory against the Israelites. The stele, found in Dhiban in 1868, constitutes one of the most important archeological parallels of accounts recorded in the Bible; the biblical narrative of the war is recorded in 2 Kings .

At the same time, Israel and the Kingdom of Aram-Damascus competed for control of the Gilead. Around 720 BC Israel & Aram Damascus were conquered by the Neo-Assyrian Empire. The kingdoms of Ammon, Edom & Moab benefited from trade between Syria and Arabia when the Assyrians increasingly controlled the Levant. Babylonians took over the Assyrians' empire after its disintegration in 627 BC. Although the kingdoms supported the Babylonians against Judah in the 597 BC sack of Jerusalem, they rebelled against Babylon a decade later. The kingdoms were reduced to vassals, a status they retained under the Persian and Hellenic Empires. By the beginning of Roman rule around 63 BC, the kingdoms of Ammon, Edom and Moab had lost their distinct identities, and were assimilated into the Roman culture. Some Edomites survived longer - driven by the Nabataeans, they had migrated to southern Judea, which became known as Idumaea; They were later converted to Judaism by the Hasmoneans.

Classical period
Alexander the Great's conquest of the Persian Empire in 332 BC introduced Hellenistic culture to the Middle East. After Alexander's death in 323 BC, the empire split among his generals, and in the end much of Transjordan was disputed between the Ptolemies based in Egypt and the Seleucids based in Syria. By the late Hellenistic period, the area had a mixed population of Jews, Greeks, Nabataeans, other Arabs, and descendants of Ammonites. One of the best surviving structures from that period is Qasr al-Abd, a Hellenistic palace built by the Jewish Tobiad family, close to the village of Iraq al-Amir.The Nabataeans, nomadic Arabs based south of Edom, managed to establish an independent kingdom in the southern parts of Jordan in 169 BC by exploiting the struggle between the two Greek powers. The Jewish Hasmonean Kingdom also took advantage of the growing geopolitical vacuum, seizing the area east of the Jordan River valley. The Nabataean Kingdom gradually expanded to control much of the trade routes of the region, and it stretched south along the Red Sea coast into the Hejaz desert, up to as far north as Damascus, which it controlled for a short period (85–71) BC. The Nabataeans massed a fortune from their control of the trade routes, often drawing the envy of their neighbours. Petra, Nabataea's barren capital, flourished in the 1st century AD, driven by its extensive water irrigation systems and agriculture. The Nabataeans were also talented stone carvers, building their most elaborate structure, Al-Khazneh, in the first century AD. It is believed to be the mausoleum of the Arab Nabataean King Aretas IV.

Roman legions under Pompey conquered much of the Levant in 63 BC, inaugurating a period of Roman rule that lasted four centuries. The eastern side of the Jordan River valley, known then as Perea, was part of the Herodian Kingdom of Judea, a vassal state of the Roman Empire. During that time period, the area became the setting for some important events in Christianity, including the Baptism of Jesus. In 106 AD, Emperor Trajan annexed the Nabataean Kingdom unopposed, and rebuilt the King's Highway which became known as the Via Traiana Nova road. The Romans gave the Greek cities of Transjordan–Philadelphia (Amman), Gerasa (Jerash), Gedara (Umm Quays), Pella (Tabaqat Fahl) and Arbila (Irbid)–and other Hellenistic cities in Palestine and southern Syria, a level of autonomy by forming the Decapolis, a ten-city league. Jerash is one of the best preserved Roman cities in the East; it was even visited by Emperor Hadrian during his journey to Syria Palaestina.

In 324 AD, the Roman Empire split, and the Eastern Roman Empire–later known as the Byzantine Empire–continued to control or influence the region until 636 AD. Christianity had become legal within the empire in 313 AD after Emperor Constantine converted to Christianity. The Edict of Thessalonka made Christianity the official state religion in 380 AD. Transjordan prospered during the Byzantine era, and Christian churches were built everywhere. The Aqaba Church in Ayla was built during this era, it is considered to be the world's first purpose built Christian church. Umm ar-Rasas in southern Amman contains at least 16 Byzantine churches. Meanwhile, Petra's importance declined as sea trade routes emerged, and after a 363 earthquake destroyed many structures, it declined further, eventually being abandoned. The Sassanian Empire in the east became the Byzantines' rivals, and frequent confrontations sometimes led to the Sassanids controlling some parts of the region, including Transjordan.

Middle Ages

In the early 7th century, the area of modern Jordan became integrated into the new Arab-Islamic Umayyad Empire (the first Muslim dynasty), which ruled much of the Middle East from 661 until 750 CE. At the time, Amman, today the capital of the Kingdom of Jordan, became a major town in "Jund Dimashq" (the military district of Damascus, itself a subsection of the Bilad al-Sham province), and became the seat of the provincial governor. Incidentally, there was also a "Jund al-Urdunn" ("Realm of Jordan") district, but that encompassed a more northerly area than modern Jordan.

Under the Umayyad's successors, the Abbasids (750–1258), Jordan was neglected and began to languish due to the geopolitical shift that occurred when the Abassids moved their capital from Damascus to Kufa and later to Baghdad.

After the decline of the Abbasids, parts of Jordan were ruled by various powers and empires including the Crusaders, the Ayyubids, the Mamluks as well as the Ottomans, who captured most of the Arab world around 1517.

Ottoman rule

In 1516, Ottoman forces invaded the Levant and gained control. Agricultural villages in Jordan witnessed a period of relative prosperity in the 16th century, but were later abandoned. For the next centuries, Ottoman rule in the region, at times, was virtually absent and reduced to annual tax collection visits. This led to a short-lived occupation by the Wahhabi forces (1803–1812), an ultraorthodox Islamic movement that emerged in Najd in Saudi Arabia. Ibrahim Pasha, son of the governor of the Egypt Eyalet under the request of the Ottoman sultan, rooted out Wahhabi power in a successful campaign between 1811 and 1818. In 1833 Ibrahim Pasha turned on the Ottomans and established his rule, whose oppressive policies led to the unsuccessful Peasants' revolt in Palestine in 1834. Transjordanian cities of Al-Salt and Al-Karak were destroyed by Ibrahim Pasha's forces for harboring a fled Palestinian revolt leader. Egyptian rule was later forcibly ended after western intervention, the Ottoman rule was restored. Russian persecution of Sunni Muslim Circassians in Circassia, forced their immigration into the region in 1867, where they today form a small part of the country's ethnic fabric. Oppression and neglect for the people of the region forced the population to decline, the only people left were nomadic Bedouins. Urban settlements with small populations included; Al-Salt, Irbid, Jerash and Al-Karak. What added to the under-development of the urban life in Jordan was the fact that the settlements were raided by the Bedouins as a source of living, the urbanites had to pay them to stay safe. Jordan's location lies in a route that is taken by Muslims going on pilgrimage to Mecca; this helped the population economically when the Ottomans constructed the Hejaz Railway linking Mecca and Istanbul in 1910. Ottoman oppression provoked the region's Bedouin tribes, such as the Adwan, Bani Hassan, Bani Sakhr and the Howeitat, to revolt, Most notable revolts were the Shoubak revolt and the Karak revolt, they were only suppressed with great difficulty.

Emirate of Transjordan

After four centuries of stagnant Ottoman rule (1516–1918), Turkish control over Transjordan came to an end during World War I when the Hashemite Army of the Great Arab Revolt, took over and secured present-day Jordan with the help and support of the region's local Bedouin tribes, Circassians, and Christians. The revolt was launched by the Hashemites and led by Sharif Hussein of Mecca against the Ottoman Empire. The revolt was supported by the Allies of World War I, including Britain and France. Sharif Hussein's sons, Faisal and Abdullah, were promised territorial rule in return.

With the break-up of the Ottoman Empire at the end of World War I, the League of Nations and the occupying powers, Britain and France, redrew the borders of the Middle East. Their decisions, most notably the Sykes–Picot Agreement, led to the establishment of the French Mandate for Syria and British Mandate for Palestine. The latter included the territory of Transjordan, which had been already allocated to Abdullah approximately a year prior to the finalization of the Mandate document (the Mandate officially introduced in 1923).

One reason was that the British government had at that point to find a role for Abdullah, after his brother Faisal had lost his control in Syria. Jordan had been a "staging area" for Faisal's and the Arab nationalists' attempted takeover of Syria in 1918, which was ultimately defeated by the French. Following this, Transjordan was left in a period of interregnum. A few months later, Abdullah, the second son of Sharif Hussein, arrived into Transjordan. Faisal was subsequently given the role of the king of Iraq and the British made Abdullah emir of the newly created Transjordanian state. At first, Abdullah was displeased with the territory given to him, and hoped it was only a temporary allocation, to be replaced by Syria or Palestine. Historian Joseph Massad has described the founding of Jordan as a state in 1921 as "a hesitant act by its architects, the British and the Hashemites."

The Permanent Court of International Justice and an International Court of Arbitration established by the Council of the League of Nations handed down rulings in 1925 which determined that Palestine and Transjordan were newly created successor states of the Ottoman Empire as defined by international law.

The most serious threats to Emir Abdullah's position in Transjordan were repeated Wahhabi incursions from Najd into southern parts of his territory. The emir was powerless to repel those raids by himself, thus the British maintained a military base, with a small air force, at Marka, close to Amman.

In 1928, Britain officially provided King Abdullah with full autonomy, though the British RAF continued to provide security to the emirate.

The Emirate of Transjordan had a population of 200,000 in 1920, 225,000 in 1922 and 400,000 (as Kingdom) in 1948. Almost half of the population in 1922 (around 103,000) was nomadic.

Kingdom of Transjordan/Jordan

Establishment
On 17 January 1946 the British Foreign Secretary, Ernest Bevin, announced in a speech at the General Assembly of the United Nations that the British Government intended to take steps in the near future to establish Transjordan as a fully independent and sovereign state. The Treaty of London was signed by the British Government and the Emir of Transjordan on 22 March 1946 as a mechanism to recognise the full independence of Transjordan upon ratification by both countries' parliaments. Transjordan's impending independence was recognized on April 18, 1946 by the League of Nations during the last meeting of that organization. On 25 May 1946 the Transjordan became the "Hashemite Kingdom of Transjordan" when the ruling 'Amir' was re-designated as 'King' by the parliament of Transjordan on the day it ratified the Treaty of London. 25 May is still celebrated as independence day in Jordan although legally the mandate for Transjordan ended on 17 June 1946 when, in accordance with the Treaty of London, the ratifications were exchanged in Amman and Transjordan gained full independence. When King Abdullah applied for membership in the newly formed United Nations, his request was vetoed by the Soviet Union, citing that the nation was not "fully independent" of British control. This resulted in another treaty in March 1948 with Britain in which all restrictions on sovereignty were removed. Despite this, Jordan was not a full member of the United Nations until December 14, 1955.

In April 1949, after the country gained control of the West Bank, the country's official name became the "Hashemite Kingdom of Jordan".

1948 War and annexation of the West Bank

Transjordan was one of the Arab states opposed to the second partition of Palestine and creation of Israel in May 1948. It participated in the war between the Arab states and the newly founded State of Israel. Thousands of Palestinians fled the Arab-Israeli fighting to the West Bank and Jordan. The Armistice Agreements of 3 April 1949 left Jordan in control of the West Bank and provided that the armistice demarcation lines were without prejudice to future territorial settlements or boundary lines.

The United Nations General Assembly adopted a plan for the future government of Palestine which called for termination of the Mandate not later than 1 August 1948.

The works of Benny Morris, Avi Shlaim, Ilan Pappe, Mary Wilson, Eugene Rogan, and other historians outline a modus vivendi agreement between Abdullah and the Yishuv. Those works are taught in most Israeli university courses on the history, political science, and sociology of the region. Archival materials reveal that the parties had negotiated the non-belligerent partition of Palestine between themselves, and that initially they had agreed to abide by the terms of the UN resolution. John Baggot Glubb, the commander of the Arab Legion, wrote that British Foreign Secretary Bevin had given the green light for the Arab Legion to occupy the territory allocated to the Arab state. The Prime Minister of Transjordan explained that Abdullah had received hundreds of petitions from Palestinian notables requesting protection upon the withdrawal of the British forces. Eugene Rogan says that those petitions, from nearly every town and village in Palestine, are preserved in The Hashemite Documents: The Papers of Abdullah bin al-Husayn, volume V: Palestine 1948 (Amman 1995).

After the mandate was terminated, the armed forces of Transjordan entered Palestine. The Security Council adopted a US-backed resolution that inquired about the number and disposition of Transjordan's armed forces in Palestine. The Foreign Minister of Transjordan replied in a telegram "that neither the UN nor US recognized Transjordan, although they both had been given the opportunity for more than two years. Yet the US had recognized the Jewish state immediately, although the factors for this recognition were lacking."

In explaining to the Security Council why Transjordan's armed forces had entered Palestine, Abdullah said: "we were compelled to enter Palestine to protect unarmed Arabs against massacres similar to those of Deir Yassin."

After capturing the West Bank during the 1948 Arab–Israeli War, Abdullah was proclaimed King of Palestine by the Jericho Conference. The following year, Jordan annexed the West Bank.

The United States extended de jure recognition to the government of Transjordan and the government of Israel on the same day, 31 January 1949. Clea Bunch said that "President Truman crafted a balanced policy between Israel and its moderate Hashemite neighbours when he simultaneously extended formal recognition to the newly created state of Israel and the Kingdom of Transjordan. These two nations were inevitably linked in the President's mind as twin emergent states: one serving the needs of the refugee Jew, the other absorbing recently displaced Palestinian Arabs. In addition, Truman was aware of the private agreements that existed between Jewish Agency leaders and King Abdullah I of Jordan. Thus, it made perfect sense to Truman to favour both states with de jure recognition."

In 1978, the U.S. State Department published a memorandum of conversation between Mr. Stuart W. Rockwell of the Office of African and Near Eastern Affairs and Abdel Monem Rifai, a Counselor of the Jordan Legation, on 5 June 1950. Mr. Rifai asked when the United States was going to recognize the union of Arab Palestine and Jordan. Mr. Rockwell explained the Department's position, stating that it was not the custom of the United States to issue formal statements of recognition every time a foreign country changed its territorial area. The union of Arab Palestine and Jordan had been brought about as a result of the will of the people and the US accepted the fact that Jordanian sovereignty had been extended to the new area. Mr. Rifai said he had not realized this and that he was very pleased to learn that the US did in fact recognize the union.

Jordan was admitted as a member state of the United Nations on 14 December 1955.

On 24 April 1950, Jordan formally annexed the West Bank (including East Jerusalem) declaring "complete unity between the two sides of the Jordan and their union in one state... at whose head reigns King Abdullah Ibn al Hussain". All West Bank residents were granted Jordanian citizenship. The December 1948 Jericho Conference, a meeting of prominent Palestinian leaders and King Abdullah, voted in favor of annexation into what was then Transjordan.

Jordan's annexation was regarded as illegal and void by the Arab League and others. It was recognized by Britain, Iraq and Pakistan. The annexation of the West Bank more than doubled the population of Jordan.  Both Irbid and Zarqa more than doubled their population from less than 10,000 each to more than, respectively, 23,000 and 28,000.

Reign of King Hussein
King Abdullah's eldest son, Talal of Jordan, was proclaimed king in 1951, but he was declared mentally unfit to rule and deposed in 1952. His son, Hussein Ibn Talal, became king on his eighteenth birthday, in 1953.

The 1950s have been labelled as a time of "Jordan's Experiment with Liberalism". Freedom of speech, freedom of the press, and freedom of association were guaranteed in the newly written constitution as with the already firmly established freedom of religion doctrine. Jordan had one of the freest and most liberal societies in the Middle East and in the greater Arab world during the 1950s and early 1960s.

Jordan ended its special defense treaty relationship with the United Kingdom and British troops completed their withdrawal in 1957. In February 1958, following announcement of the merger of Syria and Egypt into the United Arab Republic, Iraq and Jordan announced the Arab Federation of Iraq and Jordan, also known as the Arab Union. The Union was dissolved in August 1958.

In 1965 Jordan and Saudi Arabia concluded a bilateral agreement that realigned the border. The realignment resulted in some exchange of territory, and Jordan's coastline on the Gulf of Aqaba was lengthened by about eighteen kilometers. The new boundary enabled Jordan to expand its port facilities and established a zone in which the two parties agreed to share petroleum revenues equally if oil were discovered. The agreement also protected the pasturage and watering rights of nomadic tribes inside the exchanged territories.

Jordan signed a mutual defense pact in May 1967 with Egypt, and it participated, along with Syria, Egypt, and Iraq in the Six-Day War of June 1967 against Israel. During the war, Israel took control of East Jerusalem and West Bank, leading to another major influx of Palestinian refugees into Jordan. Its Palestinian refugee population—700,000 in 1966—grew by another 300,000 from the West Bank. The result of the 29 August 1967 Arab League summit was  the Khartoum Resolution, which according to Abd al Azim Ramadan, left only one option -a war with Israel.

The period following the 1967 war saw an upsurge in the power and importance of Palestinian militants (fedayeen) in Jordan. Other Arab governments attempted to work out a peaceful solution, but by September 1970, known as the Black September in Jordan, continuing fedayeen actions in Jordan — including the destruction of three international airliners hijacked and held in the desert east of Amman — prompted the Jordanian government to take action. In the ensuing heavy fighting, a Syrian tank force took up positions in northern Jordan to support the fedayeen but was forced to retreat. By September 22, Arab foreign ministers meeting at Cairo had arranged a cease-fire beginning the following day. Sporadic violence continued, however, until Jordanian forces won a decisive victory over the fedayeen in July 1971, expelling them from the country.

An attempted military coup was thwarted in 1972. No fighting occurred along the 1967 cease-fire line during the Yom Kippur War in 1973, but Jordan sent a brigade to Syria to fight Israeli units on Syrian territory.

In 1974, King Hussein recognised the PLO as the sole legitimate representative of the Palestinian people. However, in 1986, Hussein severed political links with the PLO and ordered its main offices to be closed. In 1988, Jordan renounced all claims to the West Bank but retained an administrative role pending a final settlement. Hussein also publicly backed the Palestinian uprising, or First Intifada, against Israeli rule.

Jordan witnessed some of the most severe protests and social upheavals in its history during the 1980s, protests in Jordanian universities especially Yarmouk University and urban areas protested inflation and lack of political freedom. A massive upheaval occurred in the southern city of Ma'an. There was rioting in several cities over price increases in 1989. The same year saw the first general election since 1967. It was contested only by independent candidates because of the ban on political parties in 1963. Martial law was lifted and a period of rapid political liberalization began. Parliament was restored and some thirty political parties, including the Islamic Action Front, were created.

Jordan did not participate directly in the Gulf War of 1990–91, but it broke with the Arab majority and supported the Iraqi position of Saddam Hussein. This position led to the temporary repeal of U.S. aid to Jordan. As a result, Jordan came under severe economic and diplomatic strain. After the Iraqi defeat in 1991, Jordan, along with Syria, Lebanon, and Palestinian representatives, agreed to participate in direct peace negotiations with Israel sponsored by the U.S. and Russia. Eventually, Jordan negotiated an end to hostilities with Israel and signed a declaration to that effect on July 25, 1994; the Israel-Jordan Peace Treaty was concluded on October 26, 1994, ending 46-year official state of war.

Food price riots occurred in 1996, after subsidies were removed under an economic plan supervised by the International Monetary Fund. By the late 1990s, Jordan's unemployment rate was almost 25%, while nearly 50% of those who were employed were on the government payroll. The 1997 parliamentary elections were boycotted by several parties, associations and leading figures.

In 1998, King Hussein was treated for lymphatic cancer in the United States. After six months of treatment he returned home to a rousing welcome in January 1999. Soon after, however, he had to fly back to the US for further treatment. King Hussein died in February 1999. More than 50 heads of state attended his funeral. His eldest son, Crown Prince Abdullah, succeeded to the throne.

Reign of King Abdullah II

Economy
Economic liberalization policies under King Abdullah II have helped to create one of the freest economies in the Middle East.

In March 2001, King Abdullah and presidents Bashar al-Assad of Syria and Hosni Mubarak of Egypt inaugurated a $300m (£207m) electricity line linking the grids of the three countries. In September 2002, Jordan and Israel agreed on a plan to pipe water from the Red Sea to the shrinking Dead Sea. The project, costing $800m, is the two nations' biggest joint venture to date. King Abdullah and Syrian President Bashar al-Assad launched the Wahdah Dam project at a ceremony on the Yarmuk River in February 2004.

Foreign relations
Jordan has sought to remain at peace with all of its neighbors. In September 2000, a military court sentenced six men to death for plotting attacks against Israeli and US targets. Following the outbreak of Israeli-Palestinian fighting in September 2000, Amman withdrew its ambassador to Israel for four years. In 2003, Jordan's Central Bank retracted an earlier decision to freeze accounts belonging to leaders of Hamas. When senior US diplomat Laurence Foley was gunned down outside his home in Amman in October 2002, in the first assassination of a Western diplomat in Jordan, scores of political activists were rounded up. Eight militants were later found guilty and executed in 2004. King Abdullah did, however, criticise the United States and Israel over the conflict in Lebanon in 2006.

Politics
Jordan's gradual institution of political and civil liberty has continued, but the slow pace of reform has led to increasing discontent. Following the death of a youth in custody, riots erupted in the southern town of Maan in January 2002, the worst public disturbances in more than three years.

The first parliamentary elections under King Abdullah II were held in June 2003. Independent candidates loyal to the king won two-thirds of the seats. A new cabinet was appointed in October 2003 following the resignation of Prime Minister Ali Abu al-Ragheb. Faisal al-Fayez was appointed prime minister. The king also appointed three female ministers. However, in April 2005, amid reports of the king's dissatisfaction with the slow pace of reforms, the government resigned and a new cabinet was sworn in, led by Prime Minister Adnan Badran.

The first local elections since 1999 were held in July 2007. The main opposition party, the Islamist Action Front, withdrew after accusing the government of vote-rigging. The parliamentary elections of November 2007 strengthened the position of tribal leaders and other pro-government candidates. Support for the opposition Islamic Action Front declined. Political moderate Nader Dahabi was appointed prime minister.

In November 2009, the King once more dissolved parliament halfway through its four-year term. The following month, he appointed a new premier to push through economic reform. A new electoral law was introduced May 2010, but pro-reform campaigners said it did little to make the system more representational. The parliamentary elections of November 2010 were boycotted by the opposition Islamic Action Front. Riots broke out after it was announced that pro-government candidates had won a sweeping victory.

Arab Spring
On 14 January, the Jordanian protests began in Jordan's capital Amman, and at Ma'an, Al Karak, Salt and Irbid, and other cities. The following month, King Abdullah appointed a new prime minister, former army general Marouf Bakhit, and charged him with quelling the protests whilst carrying out political reforms. The street protests continued through the summer, albeit on a smaller scale, prompting the King to replace Bakhit with Awn al-Khasawneh, a judge at the International Court of Justice (October 2011). However, Prime Minister Awn al-Khasawneh resigned abruptly after just six months having been unable to satisfy either the demands for reform or allay establishment fears of empowering the Islamist opposition. King Abdullah appointed former prime minister Fayez al-Tarawneh to succeed him.

In October 2012, King Abdullah called for early parliamentary elections, to be held at some time in 2013. The Islamic Action Front, continued in its calls for broader political representation and a more democratic parliament. The King appointed Abdullah Ensour, a former minister and vocal advocate of democratic reform, as prime minister.

Mass demonstrations took place in Amman (November 2012) against the lifting of fuel subsidies. Public calls for the end of the monarchy were heard. Clashes between protesters and supporters of the king followed. The government reversed the fuel price rise following the protest. Al Jazeera stated that protests are expected to continue for several weeks because of increasing food prices.

Arab Winter

With the rapid expansion of the Islamic State of Iraq and the Levant into northern and eastern Iraq in summer of 2014, Jordan became threatened by the radical Jihadist organization, and deployed more troops on the Iraqi and Syrian borders.

See also

 Fayfa, archaeological site
 History of Asia
 History of the Middle East
 History of the Levant
 List of kings of Jordan
 Politics of Jordan

References

Further reading 
 Al Sarhan, Atallah. "United States' Foreign Policy toward the Hashemite Kingdom of Jordan: 1990–2014." (2016). online
 Alon, Yoav. The Shaykh of Shaykhs: Mithqal Al-Fayiz and Tribal Leadership in Modern Jordan (Stanford University Press, 2016).
 Ashton, Nigel. King Hussein of Jordan: A Political Life (Yale University Press;  2008) excerpt
 Bradshaw, Tancred. Britain and Jordan: imperial strategy, King Abdullah I and the Zionist movement (Bloomsbury Publishing, 2012).
  case studies of trade in textiles, pharmaceuticals, and financial services.
 Goichon, Amélie-Marie. Jordanie réelle. Paris: Desclée de Brouwer (1967–1972). 2 volumes, illustrated.
Harding, G. Lankester. 1959. The Antiquities of Jordan. Lutterworth Press, London. 2nd impression, 1960. Translated to Arabic by Suleiman Al-Musa as: Athar Al-Urdon, 2nd. Edition, Amman: Ministry of Tourism, 1971.
 
 
 
 Sinai, Anne; Pollack, Allen. The Hashemite Kingdom of Jordan and the West Bank: A handbook (1977)
  Sixth edition 2016.

External links

Jordan History Discussion Forum 

 
Jordan
Articles containing video clips